Two ships of the Royal Navy have borne the name HMS Kennington:

 , a 24-gun sixth rate, launched in 1736 and broken up at Plymouth in 1749.
 , a 20-gun sixth-rate vessel, launched in 1756 and broken up at Sheerness in 1774.

Citations

References
 

Royal Navy ship names